The Beach is an Australian television documentary series on SBS TV and NITV. The six-part documentary series first screened as a special three-hour TV event on 29 May 2020. It was created, directed by Aboriginal filmmaker Warwick Thornton who also stars in it and is filmed by his son Dylan River for Exile Productions. 

Filmed in Jilirr, Dampier Peninsula, on the north-west coast of Western Australia, The Beach was filmed over a month at a lone beachside shack that was constructed for the documentary. The series has a focus on food; Thornton forages and fishes around his camp, using an ancient Toyota Jeep (which earlier appeared in an episode of Mystery Road).

See also
 River Cottage

References

External links 
 

Special Broadcasting Service original programming
2020 Australian television series debuts
2020s Australian documentary television series